The Thai Premier League 2009 was the thirteenth season of the Premier League since its establishment in 1996. A total of 16 teams competed in the league, with PEA FC as the defending champions.

Muang Thong United took the league championship with two games remaining, the first ever team to win the championship in their debut appearance in the top flight.

Nakhon Pathom, Sriracha and Chula United were relegated to the 1st Division.

Rules

Teams play each other twice on a home and away basis
3 Points for a win
1 Points for a draw
At beginning of the season the league winner plays the FA Cup winner in the Kor Royal Cup
Loser qualifies for Asian Champions League Qualification Round
Teams finishing on same points at the end of the season use toe-to-toe record to determine finishing position.
Bottom 10 teams are relegated to Thai Division 1 League

Member clubs and locations

1 Pattaya United and Bangkok Glass took the places of Coke Bangpra and Krung Thai Bank after purchasing the clubs. Coke Bangpra and Krung Thai Bank therefore withdrew from the league allowing Pattaya and Bangkok Glass to take position in the top flight.

2 Changed name from Bangkok University

3 Changed name from Thailand Tobacco Monopoly

4 Changed name from Port Authority of Thailand.

5 Changed name from Royal Thai Navy

Managerial changes

League table

Season notes

Before the starting of 2009 seasons, Thailand Premier League changed the official name to Thai Premier League.
Coke Bangpra sold their Thai Premier League slot to a newly formed club, Pattaya United at the end of the Thai Premier League 2008 season. Coke Bangpra therefore withdrew from the Thai football league system and Pattaya would start their life in the very top division.
Provincial Electricity Authority were drawn against Singapore Armed Forces of Singapore in the opening game of the AFC Champions League 2009 and were defeated 4-1 after extra time.
On December 30, 2008, Thailand confirmed that Denmark, North Korea and Lebanon would play in the 2009 King's Cup tournament. Thailand would open up against Lebanon to determine who would enter the final.
Thailand came runners up in the 2009 King's Cup, defeated by Denmark on penalties in the final.
Chonburi won the season opening Kor Royal Cup, defeating PEA 1-0.
In May, Chonburi progressed to the Round of 16 stage in the AFC Cup, whilst PEA got knocked out in the Group Stages.
In June, FAT confirmed that the FA Cup would be restarted and the winners would enter the AFC Cup 2010.
Osotspa M-150 changed their name mid-season to Osotspa Saraburi
BEC defeated TSW Pegasus FC of Hong Kong in the TSW Pegasus Anniversary Cup

Results

Season statistics

Top scorers
Last updated October 18, 2009

Hat-tricks

Annual awards

Coach of the Year
 Attaphol Buspakom - Muang Thong United

Defender of the Year
 Jetsada Jitsawad - Muang Thong United

Midfielder of the Year
 Kittipol Paphunga - BEC Tero Sasana

Striker of the Year
 Pipat Thonkanya - Thai Port

Young Player of the Year
 Kabfah Boonmatoon - Osotsapa M-150

Top scorer
 Anon Sangsanoi - BEC Tero Sasana

See also
 2009 Thai Division 1 League
 2009 Regional League Division 2
 2009 Thai FA Cup
 2009 Kor Royal Cup

References

External links
Official website

1
2009